The Stuttgart Peace Prize is an annual award of 5000 Euros made by the non governmental organization  ("The Instigators") to people or projects involved "in a special way for peace, justice and world solidarity".

Voting is open to all who have won either the Foundation or the instigators Stuttgart Peace Prize in the year in question, those who have made a donation before the election or are supporting members. Each voter has three votes, and may give a proposal per vote or distribute their votes over existing proposals.

Winners 
2022: Reporters Without Borders, non-governmental organization for freedom of information
2021: Maria Kalesnikava, Belarusian political activist
2020: Julian Assange, Australian investigative journalist, political activist and founder and spokesperson of WikiLeaks
2019: Sea-Watch, NGO that saves lives in the Mediterranean sea 
2018: X González, American anti-weapons activist
2017: Aslı Erdoğan, Turkish physicist, journalist and author
2016: Jürgen Grässlin, peace activist and armament opponent in Germany, publicist of non-fiction books about arms exports, military and economy policy
2015: Giusi Nicolini, Mayor of Lampedusa and Linosa.
2014: Edward Snowden, former CIA employee and whistleblower who disclosed America's extensive surveillance programme in 2013
2013: Enio Mancini and Enrico Pieri - survivors of the Sant’Anna di Stazzema massacre in Tuscany, Italy during World War II, who fight for justice and international understanding.
2012: Aktion Aufschrei – Stoppt den Waffenhandel! (Action Outcry – Stop the Arms Trade!“, Germany)
2011: Fatuma Abdulkadir Adan (Kenya) - for combining soccer and emancipation ("We aim to score not to kill.“)
2010: Werner Baumgarten - pastor for asylum seekers and refugees.
2009: Susan Bardócz and Árpád Pusztai, scientists and critics of genetic engineering.
2008: POEMA (Germany/Brazil) - program against poverty and for protection of the environment in the Amazon rainforest.
2007: Agustín Aguayo (United States) - combat medic whose application for conscientious objector status was denied forcing him to desert
2006: Wolfram Hülsemann (Germany) - Director of the NGO Brandenburg Institute for Community Guidance, Democracy and Integration
2005: Giuliana Sgrena, Italian journalist who was kidnapped in Iraq.
2004: Lama Tarayra - Palestinian pupil, for her work in reconciling Israeli and Palestinian youth
2003: Committee for Basic Liberties and Democracy, Germany.

References

External links 
 Stuttgart Peace Award Website

Peace awards